Shanks may refer to:

People with the surname 
 Alison Shanks (born 1982), New Zealand professional racing cyclist
 Bill Shankly, British football manager nicknamed "Shanks"
 Bill Shanks, American sports broadcaster and writer
 Bruce Shanks (1908–1980), American editorial cartoonist
 Charles G. Shanks (1841–1895), American journalist and editor
 Daniel Shanks (1917–1996), American mathematician
 Don Shanks (footballer) (born 1952), British footballer
 Don Shanks (stuntman) (born 1950), American actor and stuntman
 Donald Shanks (bass-baritone) (1940–2011), Australian operatic bass-baritone
 Edward Shanks (1892–1953), English writer
 Emily Shanks (1857–1936), British painter, born in Russia
 George Shanks (1896–1957), British writer, first translator of the Protocols of Zion into the English language
 Hershel Shanks (born 1930), American founder of the Biblical Archaeology Society
 Howie Shanks (1890–1941), American baseball player
 James Steuart Shanks (1826-1911), British merchant in Moscow
 John Shanks (born 1964), American rock musician and song writer
 John Peter Cleaver Shanks (1826–1901), U.S. Representative from Indiana
 Juanita Craft (1902–1985), born Juanita Jewel Shanks, American civil rights pioneer
 Katrina Shanks (born 1969), New Zealand politician
 Michael Shanks (born 1970), Canadian actor best known for his role as Daniel Jackson on Stargate SG-1
 Michael Shanks (archaeologist) (born 1959), British archaeologist
 Michael Shanks (journalist) (1927–1984), British journalist
 Nancy Shanks, American singer associated with Tori Amos
 Nelson Shanks (1937–2015), American painter
 Niall Shanks (1959–2011), British-American professor of history and philosophy
 Norman Shanks, Church of Scotland minister
 Oliver Shanks (1915–1970), Canadian boxer
 Robert Shanks, English professional footballer
 Rosalind Shanks, British actress
 Simon Shanks (1977–2006), American football player
 Tommy Shanks (born 1880), Irish soccer player
 William Shanks (1812–1882), English amateur mathematician, famous for his calculation of over 500 of digits of π, by hand
 William Somerville Shanks (1864–1951), Scottish artist
 Jordan Shanks-Markinova, Australian YouTube personality known as Friendlyjordies

Nicknames
 Edward I (1239–1307), English king known as "Longshanks"
 Nathan G. Evans (1824–1868), Confederate Army general nicknamed "Shanks"

Places 
 Camp Shanks, a United States Army installation in the town of Orangetown, New York
 Shanks, West Virginia in Hampshire County, West Virginia, United States
 Shanks Islands (Tasmania), Australia

Other uses 
 Shanks (film), a 1974 movie directed by William Castle and starring Marcel Marceau
 Shanks, a character in the manga series One Piece
 Tringa, a genus of waders, containing the shanks and tattlers
 Armitage Shanks, a UK toilet manufacturer
 F & R Shanks, British coachbuilders*
 Shanks & Bigfoot, a British songwriting/production duo
 Shanks Group plc, a UK waste mangamement company
 Shanks Restaurant, a former Michelin starred restaurant in Northern Ireland

See also 
 Shank (disambiguation)